Krasnogvardeysky District is the name of several administrative and municipal districts in Russia. The districts are generally named for the Red Guards—paramilitary formations which took active part in the 1917 Russian Revolution and the Russian Civil War and later re-organized into the Red Army.

Districts of the federal subjects

Krasnogvardeysky District, Republic of Adygea, an administrative and municipal district of the Republic of Adygea
Krasnogvardeysky District, Belgorod Oblast, an administrative and municipal district of Belgorod Oblast
Krasnogvardeysky District, Republic of Crimea, an administrative and municipal district in the Republic of Crimea (located on the Crimean Peninsula, which is disputed between Russia and Ukraine)
Krasnogvardeysky District, Orenburg Oblast, an administrative and municipal district of Orenburg Oblast
Krasnogvardeysky District, Saint Petersburg, an administrative district of the federal city of St. Petersburg
Krasnogvardeysky District, Stavropol Krai, an administrative and municipal district of Stavropol Krai

Renamed districts
Krasnogvardeysky District, name of Gatchinsky District of Leningrad Oblast in 1929–1944

Historical districts
Krasnogvardeysky District, Moscow (1969–1991), a district of Moscow

See also
Krasnogvardeysky (disambiguation)

References